This is a list of reptiles of Afghanistan.

There are 111 species of reptiles in Afghanistan.

Testudines

Testudinidae 
 Testudo
 Testudo horsfieldii

Squamata

Non-serpent squamates

Gekkonidae 
 Agamura
 Agamura persica
 Alsophylax
 Alsophylax laevis
 Alsophylax pipiens
 Bunopus
 Bunopus tuberculatus
 Asiocolotes
 Asiocolotes levitoni
 Crossobamon
 Crossobamon eversmanni
 Cyrtopodion
 Cyrtopodion caspium
 Cyrtopodion fedtschenkoi
 Cyrtopodion longipes
 Cyrtopodion scabrum
 Cyrtopodion turcmenicum
 Cyrtopodion voraginosum
 Cyrtopodion watsoni
 Eublepharis
 Eublepharis macularius
 Hemidactylus
 Hemidactylus flaviviridis
 Teratoscincus
 Teratoscincus bedriagai
 Teratoscincus microlepis
 Teratoscincus scincus

Agamidae 
 Calotes
 Calotes versicolor
 Paralaudakia
 Paralaudakia badakhshana
 Paralaudakia caucasia
 Paralaudakia erythrogaster
 Paralaudakia himalayana
 Paralaudakia lehmanni
 Paralaudakia microlepis
 Laudakia
 Laudakia agrorensis
 Laudakia nupta
 Laudakia nuristanica
 Laudakia tuberculata
 Phrynocephalus
 Phrynocephalus clarkorum
 Phrynocephalus euptilopus
 Phrynocephalus interscapularis
 Phrynocephalus luteoguttatus
 Phrynocephalus maculatus
 Phrynocephalus mystaceus
 Phrynocephalus ornatus
 Phrynocephalus raddei
 Phrynocephalus reticulatus
 Phrynocephalus scutellatus
 Trapelus
 Trapelus agilis
 Trapelus megalonyx
 Trapelus ruderatus
 Trapelus sanguinolentus
 Uromastyx
 Uromastyx asmussi
 Uromastyx hardwickii

Anguidae 
 Pseudopus
 Pseudopus apodus

Scincidae 
 Ablepharus
 Ablepharus bivittatus
 Ablepharus grayanus
 Ablepharus pannonicus
 Eumeces
 Eumeces blythianus
 Eumeces schneiderii
 Eurylepis
 Eurylepis taeniolata
 Eutropis
 Eutropis dissimilis
 Ophiomorus
 Ophiomorus brevipes
 Ophiomorus chernovi
 Ophiomorus tridactylus
 Heremites
 Heremites auratus

Lacertidae 
 Acanthodactylus
 Acanthodactylus blanfordii
 Acanthodactylus cantoris
 Acanthodactylus micropholis
 Eremias
 Eremias acutirostris
 Eremias afghanistanica
 Eremias aria
 Eremias fasciata
 Eremias grammica
 Eremias lineolata
 Eremias nigrocellata
 Eremias persica
 Eremias regeli
 Eremias scripta
 Eremias velox
 Mesalina
 Mesalina guttulata
 Mesalina watsonana
 Ophisops
 Ophisops jerdonii

Varanidae 
 Varanus
 Varanus bengalensis
 Varanus griseus

Suborder Serpentes

Leptotyphlopidae 
 Myriopholis
 Myriopholis blanfordi

Typhlopidae 
 Typhlops
 Typhlops vermicularis

Boidae 
 Eryx
 Eryx elegans
 Eryx johnii
 Eryx miliaris
 Eryx tataricus

Colubridae 
 Boiga
 Boiga trigonata
 Elaphe
 Elaphe dione
 Fowlea
 Fowlea piscator
 Hemorrhois
 Hemorrhois ravergieri
 Lycodon
 Lycodon striatus
 Lytorhynchus
 Lytorhynchus maynardi
 Lytorhynchus ridgewayi
 Natrix
 Natrix tessellata
 Oligodon
 Oligodon taeniolatus
 Platyceps
 Platyceps karelini
 Platyceps rhodorachis
 Platyceps ventromaculatus
 Psammophis
 Psammophis leithii
 Psammophis lineolatus
 Psammophis schokari
 Pseudocyclophis
 Pseudocyclophis persicus
 Ptyas
 Ptyas mucosa
 Spalerosophis
 Spalerosophis diadema
 Telescopus
 Telescopus rhinopoma

Elapidae 
 Bungarus
 Bungarus caeruleus
 Naja
 Naja naja
 Naja oxiana

Viperidae 
 Echis
 Echis carinatus
 Eristicophis
 Eristicophis macmahoni
 Gloydius
 Gloydius halys
 Gloydius intermedius
 Macrovipera
 Macrovipera lebetinus
 Pseudocerastes
 Pseudocerastes persicus

References 

Afghanistan
Reptiles
Afghanistan
 List